Yan Yean Reservoir is the oldest water supply for the city of Melbourne, Victoria, Australia. At the time of its completion in 1857 it was the largest artificial reservoir in the world.

The reservoir is managed by Melbourne Water as part of the water supply system for Melbourne.

History
The name Yan Yean refers to the Aboriginal leader who signed the Batman's Treaty in 1835 with the name "Yan Yan" ("young male").

Work commenced on 20 December 1853 when Governor Charles La Trobe turned the first sod. Construction took place at the height of the gold rush employing a tent city of 1,000 workers returning from the goldfields. The Board of Commissionaires of Sewers and Water Supply was formed that same year in response to the demand for a reliable water supply system.

The reservoir took four years to construct at a cost of £750,000. Other sources estimate the cost of the project to be £1,017,087. Most of the pipes were imported from London. It was designed by James Blackburn, an English civil engineer and former London sanitary inspector who was transported to Tasmania as a convict following charges of embezzlement. After being pardoned he came to Melbourne in 1849.

The water was originally supplied by the Plenty River; however, the water quality was poor due to stock crossings and pollution from rural towns. The problem was solved by bypassing the Plenty River and diverting water from Wallaby Creek and Silver Creek, both originating in the Great Dividing Range feeding the Goulburn River. This mountain water was captured in the Toorourrong Reservoir system, constructed in 1883–1885, and supplies water to Yan Yean via an aqueduct to this day. During its construction, the nearby neighbourhood Mernda was created and grew rapidly. Morang became South Yan Yean, and later Mernda.

At the time of its completion in 1857, it was the largest artificial reservoir in the world. Photographer Fred Kruger was commissioned by the government to provide images of the extensive works for display at the Colonial and Indian Exhibition of 1886. By 1857, the city of Melbourne had grown to a population of 100,000. The reservoir was inaugurated in the city in 1857's new year's eve.

The region was frequently hit by floods. The reservoir resisted a flood that hit Melbourne in 1923, and became the city's main water emergency resource after the incident. In 1871–72, it is an arid season that led to low water levels in the reservoir and a failure to distribute water throughout the city. During the Second World War, the catchment area was closed for security reasons.

Description
The site of the reservoir is 183 metres in altitude, allowing sufficient hydraulic head for the water to be piped throughout the city under gravity. The dam is 963 metres long. The reservoir has a capacity of 30 gigalitres. The catchment covers 2,250 hectares.

Wombats, sea eagles, hawks, ducks and deer inhabit the area.

Recreational facilities
Yan Yean Reservoir Park offers picnic areas, barbecue facilities, walking tracks and views of the reservoir and surrounding mountains. The wetlands are used by birdwatchers. Species include musk duck, Australasian grebe, great crested grebe, white-faced heron, dusky moorhen, Eurasian coot, Latham's snipe, musk lorikeet, eastern rosella, superb fairywren, Red Wattlebird, grey butcherbird and grey fantail.

References

Bibliography
 Jones, Michael Nature's Plenty: a history of the City of Whittlesea, Sydney, N.S.W. Allen & Unwin, 1992 
 Tony Dingle, Helen Doyle, Yan Yean: A History of Melbourne's Early Water Supply, 2003, Monash University

Reservoirs in Victoria (Australia)
Melbourne Water catchment
Rivers of Greater Melbourne (region)
1857 establishments in Australia
City of Whittlesea